Agnieszka Bednarek-Kasza (born 20 February 1986) is a Polish volleyball player, a member of Poland women's national volleyball team and Polish club KPS Chemik Police, a participant of the Olympic Games Beijing 2008, bronze medalist of the European Championship 2009, Polish Champion (2011, 2014).

Personal life
On June 20, 2010, she married Wojciech Kasza.

Career
In 2013 moved to KPS Chemik Police. On March 9, 2014, Bednarek-Kasza and her teammates achieved Polish Cup 2014. In the same season she won her second title of Polish Champion. On September 28, 2014 KPS Chemik Police, including Bednarek-Kasza, beat Polski Cukier Muszynianka Fakro Bank BPS Muszyna and won first trophy in season 2014/2015 - Polish SuperCup 2014. She took part in 1st edition of European Games. In semi final her national team beat Serbia and qualified to final match. On June 27, 2015 Poland was beaten by Turkey and Bednarek-Kasza with her teammates achieved silver medal.

Sporting achievements

Clubs

CEV Cup
  2012/2013 - with Muszynianka Fakro Muszyna

National championships
 2005/2006  Polish Championship, with PTPS Farmutil Piła
 2006/2007  Polish Championship, with PTPS Farmutil Piła
 2007/2008  Polish Cup, with PTPS Farmutil Piła
 2007/2008  Polish Championship, with PTPS Farmutil Piła
 2008/2009  Polish Championship, with PTPS Farmutil Piła
 2009/2010  Polish SuperCup 2009, with Muszynianka Fakro Muszyna
 2009/2010  Polish Championship, with Muszynianka Fakro Muszyna
 2010/2011  Polish Cup, with Muszynianka Fakro Muszyna
 2010/2011  Polish Championship, with Muszynianka Fakro Muszyna
 2011/2012  Polish SuperCup 2011, with Muszynianka Fakro Muszyna
 2011/2012  Polish Championship, with Muszynianka Fakro Muszyna
 2012/2013  Polish Championship, with Muszynianka Fakro Muszyna
 2013/2014  Polish Cup, with KPS Chemik Police
 2013/2014  Polish Championship, with KPS Chemik Police
 2014/2015  Polish SuperCup 2014, with KPS Chemik Police

National team
 2009  CEV European Championship
 2015  European Games

Individually
 2009 CEV European Championship - Best Server

References

External links

 ORLEN Liga player profile
 
 

1986 births
Living people
People from Złotów
Sportspeople from Greater Poland Voivodeship
Polish women's volleyball players
Olympic volleyball players of Poland
Volleyball players at the 2008 Summer Olympics
Volleyball players at the 2015 European Games
European Games medalists in volleyball
European Games silver medalists for Poland